Thayer Lamont Verschoor (born May 16, 1961) was a Republican in the Arizona Senate.

References

Living people
Arizona Republicans
1961 births